Perrunichthys perruno is the only species of catfish (order Siluriformes) of the monotypic genus Perrunichthys of the family Pimelodidae. It is sometimes called the leopard catfish. This species is native to Colombia and Venezuela, where it occurs in the Lake Maracaibo basin, and reaches a length of  TL.

References

Pimelodidae
Freshwater fish of Colombia
Fish of Venezuela
Fish described in 1944
Taxa named by Leonard Peter Schultz